The 2009–10 Four Hills Tournament was held at the four traditional venues of Oberstdorf, Garmisch-Partenkirchen, Innsbruck and Bischofshofen, located in Germany and Austria, between 29 December 2009 and 6 January 2010.

Overall standings

Oberstdorf
 HS 137 Schattenbergschanze, Germany
29 December 2009

Garmisch-Partenkirchen
 HS 140 Große Olympiaschanze, Germany
1 January 2010

Innsbruck
 HS 130 Bergiselschanze, Austria
3 January 2010

Bischofshofen
 HS 140 Paul-Ausserleitner-Schanze, Austria
6 January 2010

See also
2009–10 Ski Jumping World Cup

References

2009-10 Ski Jumping World Cup Schedule.- accessed 11 November 2009.
Official website

Four Hills Tournament
Four Hills Tournament, 2009-10
Four Hills Tournament, 2009-10
2009 in German sport
2010 in German sport
2010 in Austrian sport